Wienerberger AG is an Austrian brick maker which is the world’s largest producer of bricks, (Porotherm, Terca) and number one on the clay roof tile market (Koramic, Tondach) in Europe as well as concrete pavers (Semmelrock) in Central and Eastern Europe. In pipe systems (Steinzeug-Keramo ceramic pipes and Pipelife plastic pipes), the company is one of the leading suppliers in Europe. With its over 200 production sites, the Wienerberger Group generated revenues of €3,971 million and operating EBITDA of €694.3 million in 2021. It is based in Vienna, Austria. Founded in 1819, the company's shares have been listed on the Vienna Stock Exchange since 1869 and currently have a free float of 100%.

History 
Wienerberger was founded in 1819 in Vienna by Alois Miesbach (1791–1857) and has traded since 1869 on the Vienna Stock Exchange. In 1986 the company expanded from a local Austrian brick-maker into one of the world’s largest producer of bricks within a few years.

The company has acquired a number of its competitors, including Baggeridge PLC in June 2007, with the takeover being cleared by the British Competition Commission in May 2007; and Keymer Tiles in 2014.

References

External links 

 
Vienna Stock Exchange: Market Data Wienerberger AG

Manufacturing companies based in Vienna
Companies based in Vienna
Brick manufacturers
Austrian brands